The 1997 Generali Open was a men's tennis tournament played on outdoor clay courts in Kitzbühel, Austria that was part of the World Series of the 1997 ATP Tour. It was the 42nd edition of the tournament and was held from 21 July until 27 July 1997. Tenth-seeded Filip Dewulf won the singles title.

Finals

Singles
 Filip Dewulf defeated  Julián Alonso, 7–6(7–2), 6–4, 6–1
 It was Dewulf's 1st singles title of the year and the 2nd of his career.

Doubles
 Wayne Arthurs /  Richard Fromberg defeated  Thomas Buchmayer /  Thomas Strengberger, 6–4, 6–3

References

External links
 ITF tournament edition details

Generali Open
Austrian Open Kitzbühel
Austrian Open